The 1987–88 Rugby Football League season was the 93rd season of rugby league football in Britain.

Season summary

During the season, defending champions Wigan hosted NSWRL champions, the Manly-Warringah Sea Eagles in the 1987 World Club Challenge match. Wigan were World Club Champions for the first time when they beat Manly-Warringah 8–2 at Central Park, Wigan on 7 Oct 1987 before a crowd of 36,895 

The Stones Bitter League Champions were Widnes for the second time in their history, exactly ten years after their first. Leigh, Swinton and Hunslet were relegated.

The Challenge Cup winners were Wigan who beat Halifax 32–12 in the final.

John Player Special Trophy winners were St. Helens who beat Leeds 15–14 in the final.

Rugby League Premiership Trophy Winners were Widnes who beat St. Helens 38–14 in the final.

2nd Division Champions were Oldham. Featherstone Rovers and Wakefield Trinity were also promoted. Blackpool Borough changed their name to Springfield Borough.

Wigan beat Warrington 28–16 to win the Lancashire County Cup, and Bradford Northern beat Castleford 12–12 (replay 11–2) to win the Yorkshire County Cup.

At the end of the season players from the League were selected to go on the 1988 Great Britain Lions tour.

League Tables

Championship final Standings

Second Division

Challenge Cup

Wigan had reached the final by beating Bradford Northern 2–0 in Round One at home on 30 Jan; Leeds 30–14 in Round Two at home on 14 Feb; Widnes 10–1 in the Quarter Final at home on 27 Feb and Salford 34–4 in the semi-final played at Bolton on 12 Mar.

Wigan beat Halifax 32–12 in the final played at Wembley before a crowd of 94,273.

This was Wigan's ninth Challenge Cup Final win in eighteen Final appearances. It was the start of their record breaking eight Challenge Cup Final wins in a row.

The Wigan scrum half, Andy Gregory, won the Lance Todd Trophy for his man-of-the-match performance.

League Cup

Premiership

References

Sources
1987-88 Rugby Football League season at wigan.rlfans.com
The Challenge Cup at The Rugby Football League website

1987 in English rugby league
1988 in English rugby league
Rugby Football League seasons